Akyurt, formerly Ravlı, is a district of Ankara Province of Turkey. According to 2010 census, population of the district is 26,006 of which 25,353 live in the urban center of Akyurt.

Akyurt is an industrial area about 30 km from the city centre, near Ankara Esenboğa International Airport, on the road from Ankara to Çankırı. Factories in the district include Mikes, and a plant of the electronics company ASELSAN. There are over 18,000 residents, including many recent migrants from Çankırı, Çorum and Kastamonu, but the daytime working population of Akyurt is over 40,000.

Administrative divisions
There are 26 neighborhoods in Altındağ.

Neighborhoods

Notes

References

External links

 District governor's official website 
 District municipality's official website 

 
Towns in Turkey
Populated places in Ankara Province
Districts of Ankara Province